Scopula orthoscia is a moth of the family Geometridae. It was described by Edward Meyrick in 1888. It is found in western Australia.

References

Moths described in 1888
orthoscia
Taxa named by Edward Meyrick
Moths of Australia
Endemic fauna of Australia